Ballarat Miners is a NBL1 South club based in Ballarat, Victoria. The club fields a team in both the Men's and Women's NBL1 South. The club is a division of Ballarat Basketball Association, the major administrative basketball organisation in the region. The Miners play their home games at Ballarat Sports Events Centre.

Men's team history

Background
The Ballarat Basketball Association Inc. was incorporated in 1966 and then built its own freehold facility in 1969 on the corner of Grevillea Road and Dowling Street in Wendouree to later become known as the Ballarat Minerdome. Backed by a flourishing local basketball program and facilities at the forefront of regional basketball associations, it was announced in 1985 that Ballarat would lodge an application to join the South East Basketball League (SEBL). The year 1985 is considered the club's establishment date.

Basketball Ballarat formed a separate independent club to arrange the new venture and the Elite Teams department was established. The team chosen to represent Ballarat was called the Ballarat Miners and in 1986 the Miners were admitted into the SEBL.

The Dynasty (1987–1996)
Having entered the league in 1986, the Miners were immediately a force to be reckoned with. With Brian Goorjian at the helm, Ballarat reached the ultimate goal, with the South Conference Championship in 1987, only a year after their introduction.

Goorjian departed at the end of the 1987 season and was replaced by Al Westover, who subsequently took the team to a Conference three-peat from 1989 to 1991, taking the South Conference for the first two years before following it up with the East Conference when moving across conferences in 1991. Westover was honoured with the inaugural Coach of the Year award in 1990 for his leadership with Ballarat throughout those three years. The Miners accomplishments continued after the departure of Westover at the end of 1991, with Eric Lowe taking the side to conference runners-up in 1992 before Brendan Joyce took over in 1993.

In Joyce's first season, the Miners went through the regular season with a stellar record of 20–4, eventually losing the Conference Semi-final and finishing second overall. But the following two years they again achieved the ultimate success with two CBA National Championships with win–loss ratios of 18–4 and 19–3.

Joyce went one better than Westover, collecting consecutive Coach of the Year awards for his leadership over 1994 and 1995. 1996 saw Paul Hotchin take over as head coach and with an array of stars in his line-up, he helped take them to another final, eventually losing to North West Tasmania after a regular season record of 16–6.

With the introduction of the SEABL Most Valuable Player award, Eric Cooks made it his own, taking the prize in both 1989 and 1990. He was also included in the SEABL All-Star side in 1993, 1995 and 1996, and has an individual career winning percentage of over 75%. Cooks tops the SEABL All-time list for blocked shots, is fourth in total points, and second for total rebounds. Small forward Eric Hayes was a part of the 1994 All-Star team and has played more games than any other SEABL player. Hayes also sits second for All-time points scored, third for total rebounds and first for free throws attempted and made.

During the four-year period with Hotchin and Joyce at the helm, Ballarat went 73–17 for the regular seasons, while also recording a 2–2 win–loss ratio in Conference Finals, and a 7–1 record for National Finals, to finish 82–20 in a period of dominance in the SEABL.

This era saw the Ballarat Miners create one of the most successful dynasties in the history of Australian basketball.

New era (2014–present)
The Miners burst into the post-season in 2014 after an eight-year hiatus and again in 2015. Both matches were lost on the road, falling short of Dandenong each time in conference semi-finals. After missing the post-season in 2016, the Miners reached the SEABL South Conference final in 2017, marking their first conference final appearance in 16 years.

In 2019, following the demise of the SEABL, the Miners joined the NBL1 South. The NBL1 South season did not go ahead in 2020 due to the COVID-19 pandemic. In 2021, the Miners played out of the Ballarat Sports Events Centre.

Women's team history
Ballarat's top level women's basketball team was branded the Lady Miners since it entered the Victorian championship in 1984. It first joined the SEABL in 1990 and again in 2003. Over the following eight years, the team made the playoffs five times, winning the title in 2005. The Lady Miners were amalgamated with the Ballarat Miners in 2003 in order to be administered with the Miners under the one Ballarat Basketball Association.

In February 2011, the Lady Miners were renamed the Ballarat Rush.

In 2019, following the demise of the SEABL, the Rush joined the NBL1 South. The NBL1 South season did not go ahead in 2020 due to the COVID-19 pandemic.

In November 2021, Basketball Ballarat merged the female and male programs under the same banner in 2022, with the Ballarat Rush rebranded as the Ballarat Miners.

Women's championships
 3× Country Victorian Invitational Basketball League champions: 1995, 1996, 1997
 2× Victorian Basketball League champions: 1998, 1999
 3× Big V SCW champions: 2000, 2001, 2002
 1× SEABL champions: 2005
 2× ABA National Champions: 2005, 2006

References

External links
Ballarat Basketball's official website
"Miners relive historic 1989 VBA championship victory over Melbourne Tigers" at thecourier.com.au

South East Australian Basketball League teams
Sport in Ballarat
Basketball teams in Victoria (Australia)
Basketball teams established in 1985
1985 establishments in Australia